Bhaag Johnny is a 2015 Indian Hindi language Bollywood thriller film directed by Shivam Nair, and produced by Bhushan Kumar, Krishan Kumar, Vikram Bhatt and Ajay Kapoor. The film stars Kunal Khemu, Mandana Karimi and Zoa Morani in leading roles.  It was released on 25 September 2015.

Plot
 
Bangkok-based Janardhan "Johnny" Arora  is called in by his conniving boss Ramona Bakshi  where she accuses him of cheating and gives him a chance to redeem himself by going to Pattaya on a vacation. Whilst there, he learns from Ramona's right-hand man Mr. Nobody that she sent him to murder a girl named Tanya Malik who appears to pose some threat to Ramona. Although intent on saving his job, the moment he sets his sight on the beautiful Tanya, he is drawn into a state of confusion as to whether he should save the innocent girl's life or his job. However, a genie Jinn  appears to help him and gives him an offer to live 2 different lives of his own at once, where one life will be completely isolated from another, Johnny won't remember that he even met the Jinn. As he accepts this offer, Johnny finds himself at the head of a conspiracy and several events unfolding fast.

Cast
 Kunal Khemu as Janardhan "Johnny" Arora
 Zoa Morani as Tanya Malik
 Mandana Karimi as Rachel Robinson
 Manasi Scott as Ramona Bakshi
 Vikram Bhatt as Jinn
 Nishigandha Wad as Savitri Arora
 Arun Bali as Acharya Ji
 Mukul Dev as ACP Pathan
 Urvashi Rautela as Johnny's girlfriend 
 Major Bikramjeet Singh as Third Eye Detective
 Mohan Kapoor as Tanya's boss
 Aseem Merchant as Mr. Nobody
 Gyan Prakash as Tanya's father
 Deana Uppal in a special appearance in the song Aankhon Aankhon 
 DSP as himself in the beginning of the song Daddy Mummy

Soundtrack

The songs are composed by Mithoon, Yo Yo Honey Singh, Arko and Devi Sri Prasad (DSP). Ankit Tiwari, Yo Yo Honey Singh, Rahul Vaidya and Sunil Kamath sang for the film.

Production

Casting
Earlier, Deepak Tijori was first to direct the film with Indian television actor Karan Singh Grover. Later on, Vikram Band Tijori will not be a part of project instead of this, Kunal Khemu will play leading role.

Filming

Critical reception
Subhash K. Jha rated the film one and half stars out of five, saying, "Not that Bhaag Johnny was ever meant to be a dud. It must have sounded promising on paper, a crime thriller with a twist to the telling."

Box office
The film grossed under  in its first weekend. Kunal Khemu was praised by the critics and the audience as well for convincingly pulling off both Positive and Negative Character at the same time.

References

External links
 
 

2015 films
2010s Hindi-language films
T-Series (company) films
Indian action thriller films
2015 thriller films
Hindi-language thriller films